Elections were held in Cordillera Administrative Region for seats in the House of Representatives of the Philippines on May 10, 2010.

The candidate with the most votes won that district's seat for the 15th Congress of the Philippines.

Summary

Abra

In the province of Abra, once an election hot spot, governor Eustaquio Bersamin has called on candidates to strictly adhere to the manifesto they signed and respect the rule of law. Incumbent representative Cecilia Seares-Luna has three opponents: Ma. Zita Valera, the wife of detained former Gov. Vicente Valera; Joy Bernos-Valera, Bangued mayor Dominic Valera's daughter, and former ranking official of the Cordillera People's Liberation Army (CPLA) Mailed Molina. Abra police managed to facilitate an "agreement" in which politicians will not field candidates against one another, although it was not followed as politicians started to jockey for positions.

As a result of the tension in the province, the Commission on Elections has placed the province under its watch list.

The result of the election is under protest in the House of Representatives Electoral Tribunal.

Apayao

Incumbent Elias Bulut, Jr. is on his third consecutive term already and is ineligible for election. He will run for the provincial governorship and his fellow Bulut family member Eleanor Begtang will run as his party's nominee.

Baguio

Incumbent Mauricio Domogan of Lakas-Kampi-CMD is in his third consecutive term and thus ineligible for reelection. Former Baguio mayor and Nationalist People's Coalition regional chair Bernardo Vergara is the party's nominee for the city's Congressional seat, although Vergara is also nominated by Lakas-Kampi-CMD.

Benguet

Incumbent Samuel Dangwa is on his third consecutive term already and is ineligible for election. He will run for the provincial governorship.

Ifugao

Incumbent Solomon Chungalao of Lakas Kampi CMD is in his third consecutive term already and is barred from seeking reelection; he is running for the provincial governorship as his party nominated Nelson Allaga in his place.

Kalinga

Mountain Province

Incumbent Victor Dominguez (KAMPI) died on February 8, 2008. Incumbent governor Maximo Dalog is in his third consecutive term and is ineligible for election, and is instead running for Congress under Lakas Kampi CMD, the successor party of KAMPI.

The result of the election is under protest in the House of Representatives Electoral Tribunal.

References

External links
Official website of the Commission on Elections

2010 Philippine general election
2010